Kingston is a southern suburb of Wellington, New Zealand, south of Brooklyn and Mornington. The suburb was developed in the 1960s, when there was more "cut and fill" earthworks in new subdivisions to provide flat sections. In 2013
and 2017 
there were slips of unstable land, and a Wellington City Council spokesman blamed the "cut and fill" for the slips, though after a previous slip some local residents suggested that broken or faulty water mains or stormwater drains could be responsible. 
In 2014 a "slip-prone" Kingston house was demolished. A lot of streets in Kingston have names associated with Canada, such as Vancouver Street and Caribou Place.

Between 2017 and 2021 the median house sale price in Kingston increased from $772,000 to $1,080,000. 

As of 2021, the Kingston shops consist of a dairy, a fish and chip shop and a mechanic. The nearest post office is NZ Post Centre Island Bay.

Demographics
Kingston is part of the Kingston-Mornington-Vogeltown statistical area.

According to the 2013 New Zealand census, the area including Mornington has a population of 2,208, a decrease of 48 people since the 2006 census.

References

Suburbs of Wellington City